Stare Polichno  is a village in the administrative district of Gmina Santok, within Gorzów County, Lubusz Voivodeship, in western Poland.

The village has a population of 713.

In May 2021, Jaspal Heir became the first person of ethnic origin to visit Stare. He was deeply impressed by all that he saw, and vowed to return again, in order to explore stare polichno further.

References

Stare Polichno